The 2022 Mobile Legends: Bang Bang World Championships, (Indonesian: Kejuaraan Dunia M4 MLBB), commonly referred to as the M4 World Championships and M4, was the fourth edition of the Mobile Legends: Bang Bang World Championship, an Esports tournament for the Mobile Game Mobile Legends: Bang Bang.

The annual international tournament was organized by MLBB Game Developers Moonton, in partnership with several sponsors including the Ministry of Tourism and Creative Economy of the Republic of Indonesia. The tournament was held in Jakarta from January 1 to January 15, 2023.

Sweeping the defending champions with a 4–0 score, ECHO Philippines defeated Blacklist International in a best-of-seven series to become the fourth World Champions. It marked the second Mobile Legends: Bang Bang World Championships where two Filipino teams are upper bracket and lower bracket contenders for the said title. It also marked the third-consecutive world championship title that a Filipino team has won, beginning in M2.

Karl Gabriel "KarlTzy" Nepomuceno is the first ever MLBB player who has won two world championships.

Background 
The MLBB M4 World Championships was the fourth edition of the Mobile Legends: Bang Bang World Championship and the first edition of the games to be held in Indonesia. Previously, Malaysia and Singapore held the first three editions of the games, M1 in Kuala Lumpur and M2 and M3 in Singapore. The tournament was held on January 1, 2023, until January 15, surpassing one year of the previous editions of the tournament.

M4 featured sixteen (16) qualified teams from Asia, North America, the Middle East and North Africa (MENA), Europe and Latin America. Teams qualified through their region's qualification method, whether it be an MPL Region or a Moonton-approved qualification tournament.

A notable fact that in every edition of the World Championship, an exclusive battle pass skin and the champion skin will be released. Previously, the Fighter-hero Roger was chosen to be the battle pass skin and the Champions Skin was Estes, picked by Blacklist International. In the current battle pass, the Marksman Hero Beatrix was chosen as the Battle pass skin.

Qualified Teams 
Qualifying for the M4 World Championships comes from the competing nation's Mobile Legends: Bang Bang Professional League or commonly known as "MPL." However, regional qualifiers in the North America, Turkey, Myanmar, Mekong (Thailand, Laos, Vietnam), and Latin American regions were also held to broaden the reach of the Championship's teams.

Unlike in the previous MLBB World Championships, the Commonwealth of Independent States and Japan would not participate in the upcoming M4. On the other hand, Mekong and Myanmar will re-join after their absence in the M3 World Championship held in Singapore. The number of qualifiers for Singapore and Brazil have been reduced to one, while the Latin America region will now delegate two teams participating for the world championship.

Venue 
The M4 World Championship was announced to be held in the capital city of Jakarta, Indonesia.

Previously, the group stages and playoffs will be held at XO Hall and Istora Senayan, but due to unforeseen circumstances and for the safety of fans, both venues were changed accordingly by the M4 organizers.

Group stages for the tournament will now be held at the Bali United Studio, Jakarta Indonesia. In addition, the knockout stages will be hosted at the Tennis Indoor Senayan. The selling of tickets for the event started on October 19.

Marketing 
During the build up to the M4 World Championships, the MLBB Official YouTube Channel, alongside MPL Region YouTube channels such as the Philippines and Indonesia, have released several promotional and publicity videos to promote the upcoming world championships.

In the Philippines, the theme song "PINAS LANG MALAKAS", was released and was sung by KZ Tandingan, featuring Nik Makino. The song included the four prominent members of both qualifying teams of the Philippines, Danerie "Wise." Del Rosario and Johnmar "OhMyV33Nus" Villaluna of Blacklist International, and Karl Gabriel "KarlTzy" Nepomuceno and Tristan "YAWI" Cabrera of ECHO Philippines. The music video also featured Joshua "CH4KNU" Mangilog of Smart Omega and selected shoutcasters of MPL Philippines.

Format 
Group stage: January 1–4, 2023

 16 teams qualified for the event are split into four groups of 4 teams each.
 All matches in the group stage are played in a  series.
 The top two teams per group qualified for the Upper Bracket Playoffs.
 The bottom two teams per group qualified for the Lower Bracket Playoffs.
Knockout stage (playoffs): January 7–14, 2023

 Sixteen teams play in a double-elimination tournament.
 Eight teams begin in the Upper Bracket, eight teams begin in the Lower Bracket.
 Lower Bracket Rounds 1 and 2 are a Bo3 series. The rest of the playoffs are played in a Bo5 series.

Grand finals: January 15, 2023

 The grand finals will be a Bo7 series between the upper bracket and lower bracket finalists.

Rosters 

Notes
1.  Alexander Korystin from Ukraine, couldn't flight to Indonesia due to political crisis in Ukraine. Therefore, he is replaced as a coach by Ameniel Del Mundo from Philippines.
The Rosters for the MLBB M4 World Championships were a first with majority of the players being Filipino or are playing for the Philippines initially such as Kairi Rayosdelsol and Michael Bocado from Indonesia.

Broadcast Talents 
The following are the official talent line-up for the M4 broadcast in Jakarta, Indonesia:

Group draw 
The group draw was held on December 8, 2022. The sixteen teams that qualified for the global tournament were split into two pools and grouped into 4 groups of 4 teams each. The following were the rules for the group draw:

 Teams from the same qualified region will not be drawn into the same group, if that happens the later team will be slotted into the next group.
 Teams in Pool 1 will not be drawn in the same group, 2 teams from MLSL in Pool 2 will not be drawn into the same group.
 The order of the draw is serpentine (ABCD-DCBA-ABCD-DCBA).

Group stage 
The group stages started on January 1 and conclude on January 4. All games in the group stage will be in a Bo1 format. There will be no teams eliminated at the end of group stages, but the upper two teams in each group shall be qualified for the Upper Bracket playoffs, while the lower two shall be qualified for the Lower Bracket Playoffs.

Group A

Tiebreaker 
A three-way tie emerged between Incendio, Blacklist, and Falcon Esports each having a 2–1 win-loss standing. With this, three additional tiebreaker games were played after the final group stage game was held to determine the teams that will make the upper and the lower bracket. These tiebreaker matches were counted in the standings as per official website.

Results

Group B

Group C

Group D 

Game Schedule Reference:

Playoff Bracket 
M4 featured the same bracketing strategy from the previous MLBB M3 World Championship format, a sixteen-team double-elimination bracketing system wherein the teams will be split into four groups. In these four groups, a round-robin format proceeded to determine which two teams will be qualifying either to the upper-bracket or lower-bracket. The first two rounds of the lower bracket were a best-of-3 series, the rest of the matches were a best-of-5 series, except for the Grand Final, which were a best-of-7 championship series.

Awards 
Announced in the official M4 Press Conference & Group Draw Ceremony on YouTube, UBS Gold, an Indonesian-based Jewelry retailer and manufacturer, announced the partnership with M4 to create the very first MLBB World Championship Ring made out of solid gold. This will be the first Championship ring presented to the Mobile Legends: Bang Bang World Championship champion.

 (NEW) World Championship Ring (Exclusive design for M4)
 The MLBB World Championship Plaque / Trophy
 MLBB M4 Gold Medal for Each Player and Coach/Manager
 MLBB M4 Finals MVP -  Bennyqt (Frederic Benedict Gonzales)
 MLBB M4 Fans Choice Award -  RRQ Hoshi

Marketing

Branding 
The announcement of the venue of M4 World Championships was made on August 25, 2022, when the Mobile Legends: Bang Bang Official YouTube channel released the Host City announcement where Jakarta was chosen to host the fourth iteration of the tournament. However, it would take until December 7, 2022, when the Mobile Legends: Bang Bang social media accounts were to begin to hype up the upcoming world tournament.

On December 5, 2022, Moonton confirmed that M4 will be held in Indonesia and the tournament is set to follow its original schedule with the release of the official trailer on YouTube.

M4 Pass 
On December 16, 2022, Moonton announced that the Marksman Hero Beatrix will be receiving this edition's special M4 Pass Skin. The M4 Pass is a in-game pass that gives players rewards and incentives while doing Daily Tasks and Challenges. The M4 Pass included custom M4 effects such as Recall Animations, Kill Animations, a Trail Animation for the Hero, Limited Edition Skins and in-game rewards that can be used to unlock more rewards.

Upon purchasing any M4 Pass, Beatrix's "Light Chaser" Skin would be attained by every person who purchase it while its prime skin "Stellar Brilliance" is able to be attained once the player's M4 pass reaches Level 75. The M4 Pass was officially made to be available on December 20.

Theme Song 
On December 18, 2022, the teaser for this year's M4 was released. Eventually, on December 24, 2022, "Dare To Be Great" was released as the official song of the tournament. Three days later, the official music video was released featuring players from the 16 qualified teams and rosters of the tournament.

Sponsors 
The M4 World Championships oversees regional partners from different countries to get the chance to stream the tournament in the participating countries and also worldwide.

Broadcasting rights 
The M4 World Championships is available to be streamed and watched on YouTube in the official Mobile Legends: Bang Bang Channel and the official MPL Regional Channels with their own languages.

On December 26, 2022, Moonton announced that it has partnered with ABS-CBN, the largest network in the Philippines to broadcast the Mobile Legends: Bang Bang World Championships on Cable TV and on its social media channels in the Philippines.

Results

Notes
After the opening ceremony of the MLBB M4 World Championship Grand Finals, the host for the upcoming M5 World Championship was announced alongside the MLBB calendar of events to occur in 2023 and it will be held in the Philippines, with Abraham Tolentino, the President of the Philippine Olympic Committee confirming the Philippines' affirmation to hold the tournament.

References

External links 

Mobile Legends: Bang Bang competitions
World championships in esports
2023 in Indonesian sport
International sports competitions hosted by Indonesia